Balmer is the lava-flooded remains of a lunar impact crater. Only the heavily worn southern and eastern sections of the crater still survive; the remainder being overlaid by a lava flow that joins to the nearby mare. Balmer lies to the east-southeast of the crater Vendelinus.

Balmer was considered a Constellation Region of Interest. Light plains deposits overly mare basalt, as evidenced by multiple dark-halo craters.

Gallery

Satellite craters
By convention these features are identified on lunar maps by placing the letter on the side of the crater midpoint that is closest to Balmer.

References

External links
 

Impact craters on the Moon